Tarken Khatun or Terken Khatun may refer to:

 Terken Khatun (wife of Ala ad-Din Tekish)
 Terken Khatun (wife of Malik-Shah I)
 Terken Khatun (wife of Il-Arslan)
 Terken Khatun, wife of Ahmad Sanjar